Mylène Halemai (born 11 August 2001) is an Australian–born French tennis player and beauty pageant titleholder.

Halemai has a career-high WTA singles ranking of 794, achieved on 31 December 2018. She also has a career-high WTA doubles ranking of 503, reached on 9 March 2020.

Halemai has won five doubles titles on tournaments of the ITF Circuit. She made her main-draw debut on a Grand Slam event at the 2019 French Open, after receiving a wildcard for the doubles competition partnering Julie Belgraver.

In 2020, she was crowned Miss Wallis and Futuna 2020, and represented the region at Miss France 2021.

Personal life and background
While Mylène is a native born Australian, her father Jacob Sakopo Halemai is from the Polynesian islands of Wallis and Futuna, and her mother Michelle Campbell Taylor is of Aboriginal and Scottish descent. Mylène has four siblings: Thierry, Thelesïa, Khalia and Aurelia, all of whom have played or play high level tennis.

In 2020, she competed in Miss Wallis and Futuna 2020, and was crowned as the winner. She represented the region at Miss France 2021 in December 2020, becoming the first entrant from Wallis and Futuna since 2005, and only the sixth ever.

Grand Slam performance timelines

Doubles

ITF Circuit finals

Doubles: 6 (5 titles, 1 runner–up)

References

External links
 
 

2001 births
Living people
French beauty pageant winners
French female tennis players
French people of Wallis and Futuna descent
French people of Australian descent
French people of Scottish descent